The Collegiate Aerial Robotics Demonstration (CARD) is a robotics competition for college and university students inspired by FIRST. The inaugural event was held at the 2011 FIRST Championship in St. Louis, Missouri.

History
The possibility of a college-level FIRST competition has been discussed for many years. At the 2010 FIRST Championship in Atlanta, Georgia, a group of college students and faculty were invited to a discussion in which FIRST Founders Dean Kamen and Woodie Flowers and Editor-in-chief of Wired Magazine Chris Anderson proposed the idea of a college-level FIRST program. Chris Anderson suggested the inclusion of aerial robots in the college level program and demonstrated a robotic quadcopter (a Parrot AR.Drone) and an RC blimp. As a result of the meeting, a planning committee was formed to design and promote a college-level program, chaired by Dr. Karina J. Powell and Dr. Christopher L. Jones.  In December 2010, a kickoff video was released giving an overview of the program. Further documents and team updates have established and clarified the demonstration competition and game rules. The possibility of having a full college-level FIRST competition is still being discussed.

Games

2011
There are two games played on fields equivalent to the FRC standard size (54 feet by 27 feet).  For both games there were two competing alliances, each with two teams each composed of one air vehicle and one ground vehicle.

The first game, All Your Base, involves a 3 by 3 grid of 4'6" tall rectangular bases.  Ground robots capture bases by shooting projectiles (tennis balls) through openings on one or two sides of the base. Aerial robots capture bases by picking up a virtual payload from their starting location and then landing on top of the base. Teams score bonus points by capturing three bases in a row.

The second game is The Best Trajectory. Ground robots score points by shooting projectiles across a large trapezoidal barrier placed at midfield into mobile goals on the other side. Aerial robots can retrieve foam cube "payloads" from the top of the barrier and drop them into the goals to multiply the score of that goal. Drivers will not be able to see past the barrier. Teams may use their aerial robots to relay targeting data from the other side of the barrier. This game was never played at the 2011 demonstration in order to maintain the learning curve for teams playing All Your Base, as the result of a collective team and planning committee decision.

A third game design, named FIRST Flight, was removed from the schedule for the inaugural competition and was replaced with a practice course for the aerial robots.

2012
CARD and FIRST severed their relationship after the 2011 season. However, the schools and organizations involved in CARD are working toward setting up a separate competition to continue this program.

The 2012 game, whose tournament was to be held at the Milwaukee School of Engineering, involved robots trying to score in a series of towers. If an alliance scores at a rapid rate, they will have an additional tower available for them to score in for a short period of time.  Due to circumstances beyond the teams control, the 2012 competition was postponed.

2013
For the 2013 season, the Milwaukee School of Engineering hosted the competition on April 5 and 6.  Milwaukee School of Engineering, University of Wisconsin-Platteville, and Virginia Tech competed.  Oakland University had to drop out at the last minute due to a fatal crash to their quadcopter.

Colleges/universities involved

Teams

Other Involvement
Worcester Polytechnic Institute
Baker College

See also
International Aerial Robotics Competition

References

External links
Official CARD webpage
Daily Tribune news article regarding CARD

For Inspiration and Recognition of Science and Technology
2011 in robotics
Recurring events established in 2011
Student robotics competitions